Operatori i Shpërndarjes së Energjisë Elektrike Sh.A, or OSHEE, is an energy company engaged in constructing, operating, maintaining, and developing the electricity distribution network serving households and private clients throughout Albania. Formerly known as CEZ Shpërndarje Sh.A, the company changed its name to "Operatori i Shpërndarjes së Energjisë Elektrike Sh.A." in July 2014. It is a subsidiary of the Albanian Government under the supervision of the Ministry of Infrastructure and Energy.

See also
 KESH (Albanian Power Corporation)
 OST (Transmission System Operator)
 ERE (Energy Regulatory Authority)
 Electricity distribution companies by country

References

Electric power distribution network operators
Electric power companies of Albania